Neolissochilus stevensonii is a species within the Cyprinidae family in the  Neolissochilus genus. Its only known habitats are in Myanmar.

References

Cyprinidae
Cyprinid fish of Asia
Fish of Myanmar
Fish described in 1870